Joseph A. Mecca (born June 7, 1956) is an American politician who served in the New Jersey General Assembly from the 34th Legislative District from 1990 to 1992.

References

1956 births
Living people
Democratic Party members of the New Jersey General Assembly
People from Brooklyn